The 2017 Alanya Gold City Cup or 2017 Turkish Women's Cup  was the first edition of the Turkish Women's Cup, an invitational women's football tournament held annually in Turkey. It took place from 1 to 7 March 2017.

Format
The four invited teams played a round-robin tournament. Points awarded in the group stage follow the standard formula of three points for a win, one point for a draw and zero points for a loss. In the case of two teams being tied on the same number of points in a group, their head-to-head result determine the higher place, or in case of a tie, the goal difference.

Teams

Squads

Kosovo

Coach:  Afërdita Fazlija

Results

Goalscorers

References

External links

2017 in women's association football
Women's Cup
March 2017 sports events in Turkey
2017
Sport in Antalya
2017 in Turkish women's sport